Artisia, also known as Mosomane or Artesia, is a village in Kgatleng District of Botswana. It is located around 55 km north of Mochudi, along the Gaborone-Mahalapye road. The population was 1,462 in 2001 census.

References

Kgatleng District
Villages in Botswana